Red River is a rural locality in the Shire of Mareeba, Queensland, Australia.

Geography
Red River (the watercourse) rises in the locality and flows to the north-west.

References 

Shire of Mareeba
Localities in Queensland